A Little Bit of Miles is a live album by American jazz pianist Mal Waldron featuring performances recorded in Leiden, Holland in 1972 and released on the Freedom label.  The album was rereleased on CD on Black Lion Records in 1994 as bonus tracks on Blues for Lady Day.

Reception 
The Allmusic review by Ken Dryden awarded the album 4 stars, stating: "Mal Waldron is known for his dark, turbulent original compositions and this live trio engagement is no exception."

Track listing 
All compositions by Mal Waldron
 "A.L.B.O.M. (A Little Bit of Miles)" — 18:09
 "Here, There and Everywhere" — 17:49
 Recorded at the Jazzzolder Hot House in Leiden, Holland on February 9, 1972

Personnel 
 Mal Waldron — piano
 Henk Haverhoek — bass
 Pierre Courbois — drums

References 

Freedom Records live albums
Mal Waldron albums
1974 live albums